Shape analysis  may refer to:
 Shape analysis (digital geometry)
 Shape analysis (program analysis), a type of method to analyze computer programs without actually executing the programs
 Statistical shape analysis
 Computational anatomy#Statistical shape theory in computational anatomy
 Computational anatomy
 Bayesian Estimation of Templates in Computational Anatomy
 Nucleic acid structure determination#SHAPE, a type of RNA chemical probing to produce secondary structure models